Matjaž Koželj (born 12 March 1970) is a retired swimmer from Slovenia. He competed at the  1992 Summer Olympics in the 100 m and 200 m butterfly events, but did not reach the finals.

References

1970 births
Living people
Male butterfly swimmers
Slovenian male swimmers
Olympic swimmers of Slovenia
Swimmers at the 1992 Summer Olympics
Sportspeople from Maribor